Vöhringen is a municipality in the district of Rottweil, in Baden-Württemberg, Germany.

References 

Rottweil (district)